The Jamaican wood rail, also called the Jamaican uniform rail was the nominate subspecies of the uniform crake found on Jamaica. It became extinct around 1881.

Appearance 
The Jamaican wood rail was a reddish-brown bird some 10 inches in length.

Ecology 
Although capable of flight, the wood rail was primarily a terrestrial bird, preferring to run to escape predators.  It was originally widespread on the island, inhabiting swamps, jungle undergrowth and streambeds, to fairly high altitudes.

Extinction 
Already rare and threatened by rats and cats, the Jamaican wood rail was ultimately driven to extinction shortly after the introduction of small Indian mongooses to Jamaica in 1872.  The last specimens of the bird were collected in 1881.

References

External links 
 The Jamaican uniform rail at AviBase

Jamaican wood rail
Endemic birds of Jamaica
Extinct animals of Jamaica
Extinct birds of the Caribbean
Jamaican wood rail
Jamaican wood rail